is a Japanese football player. He last played for FC Tokyo but has been without a club since 2017.

Career
Takuya Koyama joined FC Tokyo in 2016. On May 29, he debuted in J3 League (v AC Nagano Parceiro).

References

External links

1997 births
Living people
Association football people from Tokyo
Japanese footballers
J1 League players
J3 League players
FC Tokyo players
FC Tokyo U-23 players
Association football defenders